Sentric Music is a British independent music publisher specialising in emerging song writers and artists.

Company Profile 
Founded in 2006, the company has its headquarters in Liverpool, England and staff across Europe. The company administers the works of over 100,000 artists/writers and 1 million songs in the UK and around the world.

Sentric publish their writers' work in the UK via PRS for Music and the MCPS collection societies. Sentric also collects directly in over 50 territories across Europe for its songwriters.

In May 2012 the North West Fund for Digital & Creative, managed by AXM Venture Capital Limited, made an equity investment into Sentric Music.

As well as collecting royalties for their writers, Sentric also search for synchronisation opportunities for its signings and has previously synced music on advertisements for the likes of Lexus, O2 Germany and De Montfort University. In February 2013 Sentric were nominated at the Music+Sound Awards in the Best Sync: Trailers and Promos category for the use of Kankouran song "Rivers" in the trailer for Series 6 of Skins.

In June 2012 Sentric Music entered into a co-publishing agreement with Brussels based Strictly Confidential, the publishing arm of PIAS. The first two artists signed under the co-publishing agreement were Tall Ships and Cattle & Cane.

In February 2013 Sentric Music CEO Chris Meehan was included in the Music Week "30 Under Thirty" list, highlighting the 30 finest young professionals working in the UK music business of 2013.

A partnership with INgrooves Music Publishing was announced in July 2013. INgrooves Music Publishing is a new division of INgrooves headed by industry veteran Olivier Chastan. As part of the partnership, Sentric Music provides worldwide rights administration and platform services.

In early 2014 Sentric launched a new Brand & Artist Services division, with the intention of adding value to brands with the artists/songwriters that the company works with.

Spring 2014 saw Sentric win a collaborative Technology Strategy Board bid to invest in its Rights Management system. Working in conjunction with Imperial College London, the eighteen-month big data project, titled Data Exploration and Predictive Analytics for Music Publishing, will create tools for predictive modelling and data visualisation for use in the music publishing industry.

In March 2017, Sentric Music scored multimillion-pound investment from UK-based venture capital business BGF. In June 2017, Sentric Music signed an administration deal with Chinese independent music firm Modern Sky Entertainment.

In July 2018, music distributor Tunecore partnered with Sentric, allowing the company access to Sentric's technology and global collection network, while enhancing Tunecore's distribution and publishing administration services.

In February 2022, it was announced Sentric Music has been acquired by the Switzerland-headquartered fintech company, Utopia Music. It was also announced that Sentric Music’s CEO, Chris Meehan, would join Utopia Music as Vice President of Royalty Management Services.

Awards 
In August 2014 Sentric Music was nominated in the Sync Team (Independent Publisher) and Sync - Individual Placement (TV Show: Sports) categories at the Music Week Sync Awards 2014.

In December 2010 Sentric Music was winner of the Virtual Business Awards 2010.

References

External links
 Official website

Music publishing companies of the United Kingdom
Publishing companies established in 2006
Companies based in Liverpool